The Longwood Lancers men's soccer team is an intercollegiate varsity sports team of Longwood University. The team is a member of the Big South Conference of the National Collegiate Athletic Association.

Coaching staff

Championships

Atlantic Soccer Conference Tournament Championships

Rivalries
Longwood's primary rivals are Liberty and Radford.

Record against Big South opponents

Totals through March 17, 2019

Individual honors

Team honors 
 Atlantic Soccer Conference Tournament
 Winners (2): 2008, 2011

References

External links 
 

 
1977 establishments in Virginia
Association football clubs established in 1977